Hestiaeus of Perinthus was one of Plato's students.

References
Diogenes Laërtius, Life of Plato. Translated by C.D. Yonge.
 Guthrie W.K.C. A History of Greek Philosophy. V. 5: The Later Plato and Academy. Cambridge: Cambridge University Press. 1978 p.491

4th-century BC philosophers
Academic philosophers
Students of Plato